John Sampson Toll (October 25, 1923 – July 15, 2011) was an American physicist and educational administrator.

Education
Toll received his bachelor's degree in physics from Yale University in 1944, after which he served in the U.S. Navy in World War II.  He finished his Ph.D. in physics at Princeton in 1952.

Career
He then moved to the University of Maryland, where he became chair of the Department of Physics and Astronomy in 1953. During his tenure as chair, he was responsible for a major increase in size and quality of the department. The physics building at the University of Maryland is named for him.

In 1965 he left to become the second president of the State University of New York at Stony Brook, a position he held until 1978. While he was there, Stony Brook University, one of four SUNY centers created by then-governor Nelson Rockefeller (briefly Vice President of the United States under Gerald Ford), and, until recently, the only four allowed to call themselves "universities", grew to more than 17,000 students from a handful who started their academic careers before the campus was even finished, at the now-defunct State University of New York on Long Island (SUCOLI).

He then returned to the University of Maryland to become president of the original five campuses of the University of Maryland. Comparable to a chancellor position in other state university systems, at the time Toll oversaw the University of Maryland, College Park, University of Maryland, Baltimore County, University of Maryland University College, University of Maryland, Eastern Shore, and University of Maryland at Baltimore. When Governor William Donald Schaefer decided to merge most of the state's public universities into a single system, Toll was put in charge of the merger. He then became the first chancellor of the new University System of Maryland.

In 1995, at age 71, he became president of Washington College, a small, private liberal arts school in Chestertown, Maryland. There, he was credited with fixing the school's budget crisis and raising its national profile.

As a physicist, Toll was known for his work in dispersion theory and elementary particle physics. Between university jobs in the early 1990s, he was president of the Universities Research Association which oversaw the U.S. Superconducting Supercollider project until Congress defunded it. In January 2004, he announced that he would leave Washington College and return to physics research at the University of Maryland.

Personal life
He married the former Deborah Taintor, and they had two daughters. Toll died on July 15, 2011, of respiratory failure at Fox Hill Assisted Living in Bethesda, Maryland.

References

External links
Biography on the American Institute of Physics website
John S. Toll papers at the University of Maryland Libraries 

1923 births
2011 deaths
Particle physicists
University of Maryland, College Park faculty
Chancellors of the University System of Maryland
Presidents of Washington College
Yale University alumni
Presidents of Stony Brook University
Fellows of the American Physical Society